The Pharmaceutical Benefits Scheme (PBS) is a program of the Australian Government that subsidises prescription medication for Australian citizens and permanent residents, as well as international visitors covered by a reciprocal health care agreement. The PBS is separate to the Medicare Benefits Schedule, a list of health care services that can be claimed under Medicare, Australia's universal health care insurance scheme.

The out-of-pocket amount for some medications has increased since 1960, with increased subsidies for concession holders beginning in 1983. Safety nets were introduced in 2000 and expanded in 2004, limiting the total out-of-pocket expense singles or families would pay per year for health care in Australia.

History
In 1944, the Chifley Labor Government passed the Pharmaceutical Benefits Act 1944 as part of a wider plan to create a British-style National Health Service. The Act was an extension of the similar Repatriation Pharmaceutical Benefits Scheme established in 1919 for Australian servicemen and women who had served in the Boer War and World War I. The Act provided for free pharmaceuticals, with benefits restricted to medicines listed in the Commonwealth Pharmaceutical Formulary, and only on the presentation of a prescription, written by a registered medical practitioner on an official government form, to a Commonwealth approved pharmacist. A Formulary Committee was established with the role of advising the Minister on the composition of the formulary. The committee was a precursor to the Pharmaceutical Benefits Advisory Committee.

However, the Australian Branch of the British Medical Association (BMA) challenged the Act and the High Court of Australia in Attorney-General (Vic) ex rel Dale v Commonwealth. declared the Act unconstitutional on the basis that the Commonwealth did not have the power to spend money on the provision of medicines. The decision prompted the 1946 referendum which amended the Constitution to allow for Commonwealth provision of pharmaceutical benefits. A new Pharmaceutical Benefits Act 1947 was subsequently passed. However, ongoing resistance by the medical profession forced amendments to provisions that required practitioners to use Commonwealth prescription forms or face a fine. Again the BMA challenged the Act and again the High Court found it unconstitutional. In November 1947, under Section 15 of the 1947 Act, the Commonwealth made arrangements to supply free products for immunisation against diphtheria and whooping cough. Despite the High Court finding, the Commonwealth attempted to implement the scheme with voluntary participation. However, only few doctors participated. The PBS commenced on 1 July 1948.

Finally, the High Court in October 1949 ruled that the PBS was constitutional in British Medical Association v Commonwealth (1949).

With the election of the Menzies Liberal Government in December 1949, the comprehensive scheme proposed under the 1947 Act was altered to limit the PBS list to 139 'life saving and disease preventing drugs'. The new regulations came into force on 4 September 1950. Changes to PBS were introduced on 1 March 1960 by the National Health Act No. 72 1959, which combined the existing pensioner and general schemes, expanded the range of drugs for the general public, and introduced a patient contribution (or co-payment) of 5 shillings to provide some control on volumes and expenditure. Despite the introduction of the co-payments, prescription volumes increased from 24.6 million in 1959/60, to 60.4 million in 1968/69, and Commonwealth expenditure rose from $43 million to $100 million at the end of the decade.

By 2003 the number of drugs included under the scheme had expanded to 601 general products which were marketed as 2,602 different brands. The scheme was appealing to policy makers because it required no major capital works program and could be implemented immediately without lengthy consultation with the medical profession.

Operations

PBS is governed by the National Health Act 1953 and National Health (Pharmaceutical Benefits) Regulations 1960 (Cth). Pharmaceutical benefits under PBS may only be supplied by pharmacists and medical practitioners approved under the Act.

Applications to list a drug on the Pharmaceutical Benefits Schedule are administered by the Department of Health. Pharmaceutical benefits under the PBS are administered by Medicare Australia (formerly the Health Insurance Commission) under the Health Insurance Act 1973 (Cth).

A benefit under PBS is only given on medications which are listed in the Pharmaceutical Benefits Schedule. The medication may be listed for general use as an unrestricted benefit, or for a specific indication as a restricted benefit. When a PBS medication is dispensed by a pharmacist, the patient pays the patient contribution (subject to concessions and safety nets) and Medicare Australia pays the remainder of the agreed cost of the medication to the pharmacist.

The cost of a medication is negotiated between the government, through the Department of Health, and the supplier of the drug. The agreed price becomes the basis of the dispensed price of the medication which is negotiated between the government and the Pharmacy Guild of Australia under the current Community Pharmacy Agreement. The dispensed price includes the wholesaler's markup, pharmacist's markup, and a dispensing fee. Pharmacies purchase PBS-listed drugs from the wholesaler or supplier, and claim the difference between the dispensed price and the patient co-payment contribution from Medicare Australia.

Patient contribution and safety net
When purchasing a medication under PBS the maximum price a patient pays is the patient contribution (also called a co-payment or out-of-pocket cost), which in 2019 was A$40.30 for general patients. For PBS medications costing less than $40.30, the patient pays the PBS dispensed price plus an additional $1.17 safety net recording fee plus an optional pharmacy charge of $4.33 or less, provided that the total charge does not exceed $40.30.

Concessional patients – i.e., low-income earners, welfare recipients, Health Care Card holders, etc. and those covered under the Repatriation Pharmaceutical Benefits Scheme (RPBS) – pay a patient contribution of $6.50 in 2019. Patient contributions are compulsory and cannot be discounted by pharmacies.

Safety net provisions in PBS reduce patient contributions when singles and families exceed in a calendar year the PBS safety net threshold: when a general patient reaches the general PBS threshold, their co-payment reduces to the concession price for the remainder of that calendar year; while concession patients who reach the concession PBS threshold do not pay anything on PBS medications for the remainder of the year. The PBS safety net is separate from and in addition to the Medicare safety nets.

Changes in patient contributions and the safety net over the years are as follows:

Foreign visitors
PBS subsidised medications are also available to foreign visitors whose countries have entered into a Reciprocal Health Care Agreement with Australia. These countries are the United Kingdom, Ireland, New Zealand, Malta, Italy, Sweden, the Netherlands, Finland, Norway, Belgium and Slovenia. Eligible foreign visitors must produce a passport to obtain subsidised medications.

2012 price drop
The biggest cuts on prices of medicines occurred from 1 April 2012 under the Gillard Labor government. PBS pricing for low-income consumers remained at $5.80 per script.

Integrity and cost containment measures

Safety net 20-day rule
In an effort to limit the cost of PBS by discouraging patients from filling PBS prescriptions earlier than needed, in 2009 the safety net 20-day rule was brought in. Under the rule, a repeat prescription supplied within 20 days of a previous supply of the same medicine will not count towards the PBS safety net threshold. If the patient has already reached the safety net threshold, they will be charged the normal patient contribution instead of the reduced safety net amount.

Brand Premium and generic medicines
In an effort to limit the cost of PBS, in July 2007 the Australian Government introduced brand premiums on medications where cheaper generic brands were available. The Brand Premium is usually the price difference between the innovator brand and the generic brand. The patient pays the Brand Premium in addition to the normal patient contribution if they decline to purchase the generic brand. The Brand Premium paid does not count toward either safety net threshold and must still be paid even after the threshold is reached.

Pharmacists are allowed to substitute generic brands for prescribed brands if the brands are flagged "a" in the Schedule of Pharmaceutical Benefits, and if consent is obtained from the patient and prescriber. The prescriber's consent is always assumed to be granted unless "brand substitution not permitted" is indicated on the prescription.

The National Health Act 1953 (Cth) divided the PBS formulary into an F1 category (for patented, single brand medicines) and an F2 category (for generic medicines) with reduced reference pricing between them. Academic opinion is divided about the value of these changes and the extent to which they arose from industry lobbying drawing strength from Annex 2C of the AUSFTA.

Therapeutic Group Premium
On 1 February 1998, another effort to limit the cost of the PBS involved the introduction of Therapeutic Group Premiums (TGPs) on medications that are priced significantly above the cheapest medication in a defined therapeutic sub-group where the drugs are considered to be of similar safety and efficacy. The TGP is the price difference between the premium brand and the benchmark (base) price for drugs in the class. The patient must pay this TGP in addition to the normal patient co-payment contribution if they have been prescribed such a medication. The TGP paid does not count toward the Safety Net threshold.

However, a prescriber may obtain an exemption from the TGP if:
 adverse effects occurring with all of the base-priced drugs; or
 drug interactions occurring with all of the base-priced drugs; or
 drug interactions expected to occur with all of the base-priced drugs; or
 transfer to a base-priced drug would cause patient confusion resulting in problems with compliance.

Such an exemption requires an approved PBS Authority prescription from Medicare Australia.

Need for Medicare card
Since 2002, a Medicare card has been required to be shown at a pharmacy when collecting PBS medications. The pharmacy can retain the card number for use when the cardholder returns with another prescription.

Prescription Shopping Programme
The Prescription Shopping Programme (PSP) has been set up to identify patients who may be getting more PBS subsidised medicines than they need, which is also related to “doctor shopping”. The programme identifies patients who, in any 3-month period, receive:
 any PBS items prescribed by 6 or more different prescribers
 a total of 25 or more PBS target items
 a total of 50 or more items. This includes PBS items both target and non-target, supplied to the patient.

Schedule of Pharmaceutical Benefits
The Pharmaceutical Benefits Advisory Committee (PBAC) makes recommendations to the Minister for Health and Ageing regarding drugs which should be made available as pharmaceutical benefits, which are listed on the Schedule of Pharmaceutical Benefits. The Schedule is published monthly since January 2007, (prior to this it was published three times a year).

In considering a medication for listing on the PBS, the PBAC considers factors including:
 The conditions for which the drug has been approved for use in Australia by the Therapeutic Goods Administration. The PBAC only recommends the listing of a medicine for use in a condition which is in accordance with the Australian Register of Therapeutic Goods.
 The conditions in which use has been demonstrated to be effective and safe compared to other therapies.
 The costs involved. The PBAC is required to ensure that the money that the community spends in subsidising the PBS represents cost-effective expenditure of taxpayers' funds.
 A range of other factors and health benefits. These factors may include, for example, costs of hospitalisation or other alternative medical treatments that may be required, as well as less tangible factors such as patients' quality of life.

Decisions on PBS listing are generally made on a health economics perspective, using cost-effectiveness analysis.  Cost-effectiveness analysis evaluates the cost and health effects of one technology versus the cost and health effects of another technology, which is usually standard of care. A new technology whose incremental health benefit justifies its additional expense is deemed to be cost-effective and thus reimbursed by PBAC.  Drugs that provide little health benefit at considerable additional expense, such as the PDE5 inhibitors (e.g. sildenafil) and certain expensive cancer chemotherapy drugs are not listed on the basis of poor cost-effectiveness. Nonetheless, cost-effectiveness may not be the decisive factor. For example, for a drug that is the only available treatment for a severe illness, listing may be recommended on the basis of the "rule of rescue". The principles that are applied during the evaluation of drugs for PBS listing are described in the PBAC Guidelines.

Unrestricted benefits
Drugs that have unrestricted benefit listing on the PBS are available for general use without being limited to particular indications. Such items are typically those whose use in clinical practice is widely accepted. Examples include methotrexate, prednisone and amoxycillin.

Restricted benefits
Certain medications listed on the PBS are available only for specific therapeutic indications or to patients meeting specific criteria where the PBAC has deemed that the cost-benefit analysis is favourable only in those indications/patients. These are noted as "restricted benefits" on the Schedule. Medicare Australia places the onus of policing restricted benefits on the prescribers themselves and the pharmacists dispensing (unless the listing is also 'Authority Required'). For example, the COX-2 inhibitor celecoxib is listed on the PBS as a restricted benefit for the symptomatic treatment of osteoarthritis and rheumatoid arthritis. Prescribers using celecoxib for other indications are expected to indicate "non-PBS" on the prescription, and/or the pharmacist dispensing the celecoxib should charge the patient the full cost.

Authority required benefits
Some PBS medications are restricted and require prior approval from Medicare Australia. These are noted as "authority required benefits" on the Schedule. Again, the PBAC has deemed that the cost-benefit analysis is favourable only under in specific indications/patients under certain circumstances. Authority may be obtained by telephone to Medicare Australia (known as "phone approval") or in writing from an authorised delegate of the Minister for Health. Prescriptions must be written on an Authority Prescription Form, and the approval number must be noted on the prescription. Pharmacists cannot dispense the item as a pharmaceutical benefit unless it has been approved by Medicare Australia (indicated by the presence of the approval number).

In obtaining a phone approval, the doctor simply identifies themselves (using their name and provider number), the patient (using their Medicare number), and when asked by the operator, confirms which of the conditions eligible for an authority the patient is suffering from. Medicare normally accepts the doctor's assertion that the condition exists as sufficient. For a written Authority however, evidence of diagnosis and patient eligibility criteria such a pathology test results are usually required.

Some drugs may have Authority Required (Streamlined) status which does not require an explicit approval from Medicare, instead the doctor can use the Authority code found in the published Schedule for a given drug/indication.

2016 removal of medications 
In 2016, 17 types of medication were removed from the PBS, including Panadol Osteo, aspirin, iron/folic supplements, electrolytes, and laxatives. Other medications include medication for reflux, skin allergies, antacids, urine test strips, and Vitamin B12 injections. The change is expected to save approximately $87 million a year.

Sustainability
In its first year, the PBS cost the Commonwealth Government £149,000 (or $7,600,000 in 2009). The PBS now costs the Commonwealth approximately $6.5 billion a year to operate, despite consumers contributing around $1.3 billion in patient co-payments. According to a report by the Australian Productivity Commission the PBS is expected to cost 2.6% of Australia's GDP by 2045 up from 0.7% in 2005. Further attempts to restrain the growth in costs of the PBS may be needed, however, attempts to increase consumer prices of drugs have always proved politically unpopular. The comparative cost-effectiveness processes of the PBS nonetheless ensure it provides Australian citizens with more equitable access to medicines than in many other developed nations and for many the issue of sustainability of the PBS as a key component of the egalitarian architecture of Australian society is equivalent to asking whether that nation's education system or defence forces are sustainable.

Former federal Treasurer Peter Costello and the Liberal Party attempted to raise the patient co-payment of PBS medicines by up to 30 per cent in the 2002 Federal Budget, however this measure was blocked in the Senate in which various minor parties held the balance of power. However, in June 2004 the main opposition party, the Australian Labor Party, announced that it would allow the PBS co-payment increases to proceed through the Senate.

The Grattan Institute Report March 2013
Grattan Institute Health Program released a report titled  "Australia’s bad drug deal" by Dr Stephen Duckett, in which he states that Australia's Pharmaceutical Benefits Scheme pays at least $1.3 billion a year too much for prescription drugs. New Zealand, which has capped its budget and appointed independent experts to make decisions through the Pharmaceutical Management Agency (Pharmac), pays a sixth as much as the PBS for the same drugs. Public hospitals in two Australian states pay much lower prices than the PBS. In one case, the prices are just a sixth of PBS prices. In one extreme example the report states that "The price of one drug, Olanzapine, is 64 times higher on the PBS than in Western Australian public hospitals". This report proposes three ways Australia can regain its lost leadership in pharmaceutical pricing.

See also 

 Health care in Australia
 Social security in Australia
 Therapeutic Goods Administration

References

External links
Online searchable version of the PBS – the current PBS schedule
Department of Health PBS website
Medicare Australia PBS website
The Pharmaceutical Benefits Scheme: History, Current Status and Post-Election Prognosis (November 2001)
The Pharmaceutical Benefits Scheme – an Overview
https://www.tga.gov.au/alert/ssri-antidepressants-actions-therapeutic-goods-administration-concerning-use-antidepressants-children-and-adolescents 
https://www.pbs.gov.au/medicine/item/2236Q-8836C

Pharmaceuticals policy
Pharmacy in Australia
Medicare Australia
1948 introductions